Streptocephalus sealii, the spiny-tail fairy shrimp, is a species of branchiopod in the family Streptocephalidae. It is found in Central America and North America.

Subspecies
These two subspecies belong to the species Streptocephalus sealii:
 Streptocephalus sealii coloradensis Ryder
 Streptocephalus sealii sealii

References

Further reading

 

Anostraca
Articles created by Qbugbot
Crustaceans described in 1879